Dizoniopsis is a genus of minute sea snails, marine gastropod molluscs in the family Cerithiopsidae. 

This genus was described by Sacco in 1895.

Species
Species in the genus Dizoniopsis include:
 Dizoniopsis abylensis Bouchet, Gofas & Warén, 2010
 Dizoniopsis apexclarus Rolán, 2007
 † Dizoniopsis aquitaniensis (Cossmann & Peyrot, 1922) 
 Dizoniopsis aspicienda Bouchet, Gofas & Warén, 2010
 † Dizoniopsis bilineata (Hoernes, 1848)
 † Dizoniopsis bilineatoides Gougerot & Le Renard, 1981 
 † Dizoniopsis boucheti Landau, Ceulemans & Van Dingenen, 2018 
 † Dizoniopsis brevicaput Lozouet, Lesport & Renard, 2001 
 Dizoniopsis concatenata (Conti, 1864)
 Dizoniopsis coppolae (Aradas, 1870)
 Dizoniopsis gothica Jay & Drivas, 2002
 Dizoniopsis herberti Jay & Drivas, 2002
 Dizoniopsis herosae Jay & Drivas, 2002
 Dizoniopsis zannii Cecalupo & Perugia, 2018
Species brought into synonymy
 Dizoniopsis micalii Cecalupo & Villari, 1997: synonym of Cerithiopsis micalii (Cecalupo & Villari, 1997)
 Dizoniopsis pulchella (Jeffreys, 1858): synonym of  Cerithiopsis jeffreysi R. B. Watson, 1885

References

 Bouchet P., Gofas S. & Warén A. (2010). Notes on Mediterranean Dizoniopsis (Gastropoda: Cerithiopsidae), with the description of two new species. Iberus 28(2): 51-62
Two new species of the Cerithiopsidae (Gastropoda: Triphoroidea) for the Mediterranean Sea. Bolletino Malacologico 54: 56-60

External links
 Sacco, F. (1895) I Molluschi dei terreni terziarii del Piemonte e della Liguria. Parte XVII. (Cerithiidae, Triforidae, Cerithiopsidae e Diastomidae). Carlo Clausen, Torino, 83 pp., 3 pl

Cerithiopsidae